Sanchai Ratiwatana, nicknamed Tong (born January 23, 1982, in Bangkok), is a professional tennis player from Thailand. He turned professional in 2004.

In 2007, Sanchai and his twin brother Sonchat Ratiwatana won their first ATP doubles title in Bangkok. They won their second title at the Chennai Open in India in 2008.

He reached World No. 39, his best doubles ranking, on 28 April 2008.

ATP career finals

Doubles: 3 (2 titles, 1 runner-up)

ATP Challenger Tour finals

Doubles: 81 (48–33)

Grand Slam doubles timeline

External links
 
 

Sanchai Ratiwatana
Sanchai Ratiwatana
1982 births
Living people
Sanchai Ratiwatana
Asian Games medalists in tennis
Tennis players at the 2006 Asian Games
Tennis players at the 2010 Asian Games
Tennis players at the 2014 Asian Games
Tennis players at the 2018 Asian Games
Identical twins
Twin sportspeople
Sanchai Ratiwatana
Sanchai Ratiwatana
Tennis players at the 2016 Summer Olympics
Sanchai Ratiwatana
Medalists at the 2006 Asian Games
Medalists at the 2010 Asian Games
Medalists at the 2014 Asian Games
Universiade medalists in tennis
Sanchai Ratiwatana
Sanchai Ratiwatana
Sanchai Ratiwatana
Southeast Asian Games medalists in tennis
Competitors at the 2005 Southeast Asian Games
Competitors at the 2007 Southeast Asian Games
Competitors at the 2009 Southeast Asian Games
Competitors at the 2011 Southeast Asian Games
Competitors at the 2015 Southeast Asian Games
Competitors at the 2017 Southeast Asian Games
Sanchai Ratiwatana
Sanchai Ratiwatana
Competitors at the 2019 Southeast Asian Games
Medalists at the 2003 Summer Universiade
Medalists at the 2007 Summer Universiade